The Australian cricket team toured the West Indies in the 1990–91 season to play a five-match Test series against the West Indies.

The West Indies won the series 2–1 with two matches drawn.  The West Indies therefore retained the Sir Frank Worrell Trophy.

Australian squad
Australia had just defeated England 3–0 at home during the 1990–91 season. The team has recovered from the defeats of the mid 80s and there was hope the team could beat the West Indies in a series for the first time since 1975–76. Wisden wrote that the tour "began with exalted expectations of an epic contest between arguably the two strongest teams in the game."

The Australian squad was as follows:
Batsmen – Allan Border (captain), Geoff Marsh (vice-captain), David Boon, Dean Jones, Mark Taylor, Mark Waugh, Steve Waugh, Mike Veletta (also back up keeper)
Fast bowlers – Terry Alderman, Craig McDermott, Mike Whitney, Merv Hughes, Bruce Reid
Spinners – Greg Matthews, Peter Taylor
Wicketkeeper – Ian Healy

Test series summary
The West Indies won the second and fourth tests easily. Australia won the fifth test.

1st Test

2nd Test

3rd Test

4th Test

5th Test

ODI series summary

Australia won the Cable and Wireless Series 4–1.

1st ODI

2nd ODI

3rd ODI

4th ODI

5th ODI

Controversy
A book was written about the tour, Calypso Cricket by Roland Fishman, in which some Australian cricketers were quoted bragging about how many women they slept with. This was seen as a breach of the unspoken agreement between players and journalists for the latter not to report on the former's private lives, and embarrassed Greg Matthews, who was a friend of Fishman's, and who helped him get access to the players. Matthews:
Fishman lied to me. He bludged my money, my clothes, my bed and he told me he was writing a story about cricket in the Caribbean and the way of life. It was anything but that. He deceived me to the max. I haven't seen him since and next time I see him I'll be spitting in his face.

References

External links
Australian cricket team in the West Indies 1990–91 at CricketArchive
Australian cricket team in the West Indies 1990–91 at Cricinfo

1991 in Australian cricket
1990-91
West Indian cricket seasons from 1970–71 to 1999–2000
International cricket competitions from 1988–89 to 1991
1991 in West Indian cricket